The Sri Lanka Thilaka is a non-titular national honour of Sri Lanka awarded "for service to the nation". Sri Lanka Thilaka ranks lower than Kala Suri.

Awardees
Awardees include:

1998
 H. K. Hettiarachchi  
 D. C. M. Piyatilake
 T. A. Sirisena
 K. Arnis
 Karunapala Aprakke
 Piyadasa Wickramanayake
 K. S. Jayasena
 G. Liyanage David
 M. R. T. Karunaratne
 Kuragala Pinsara
 W. Jayathilaka
 Edmund Opanayake
 G. S. B. Senanayake
 U. M. Haniffa (Maruthoor Ghani)
 S. V. P. Tikiri Panikkiya
 Sunil Premadasa

2005
 Nayanatara Gitani Fonseka 
 Rohana Upendra Kuruppu
 T. M. Priyantha Nimal de Silva
 V. A. Thirugnanasuntharam

2017 
 Adagamage Pandula Adagama
 Hema Bandara Jayasinghe

References

External links

Civil awards and decorations of Sri Lanka